Argentino hasta la muerte  (English language: Argentine Until Death) is a 1971  Argentine war film set during the Paraguayan War (1864-1870), directed and written by Fernando Ayala with Félix Luna. The film premiered on 6 May 1971 in Buenos Aires.

Cast
Héctor Alterio
Arnaldo André
Thelma Biral
Rey Charol
Héctor da Rosa
Gabriela Gili
José María Gutiérrez
Susana Lanteri
Víctor Laplace
Leonor Manso
José Luis Mazza
Eduardo Muñoz
Lautaro Murúa
Roberto Rimoldi Fraga
Martha Roldán
Fernando Siro
Walter Soubrie
María Valenzuela  (as María del Carmen Valenzuela)
Myriam Van Wessen
Fernando Vegal
Jorge Villalba

External links
 

1971 films
1970s Spanish-language films
Films directed by Fernando Ayala
Paraguay in fiction
Argentine war drama films
1971 war films
1970s Argentine films
1970s war drama films